6Q or 6-Q may refer to:

6Q, IATA code for Slovak Airlines
Renault 6Q, a series of engines by Renault
6Q, a six-cylinder inline engine used in the Nord Pingouin
6Q-01, used in the Caudron Simoun
6Q-09, used in the Caudron Simoun
6Q-10, used in the Nord Noralpha
6q, an arm of Chromosome 6 (human)
Task Group 6Q of the International Telecommunication Union, a developer of PEAQ
6Q, the production code for the 1984 Doctor Who serial Planet of Fire

See also
Q6 (disambiguation)